The 2022 Portimão DTM round was a motor racing event for the Deutsche Tourenwagen Masters held between 30 April and 1 May 2022. The event, part of the 36th season of the DTM, was held at the Algarve International Circuit in Portugal.

Results

Race 1

Qualifying

Race

Race 2

Qualifying

Race

Championship standings

Drivers Championship

Teams Championship

Manufacturers Championship

 Note: Only the top five positions are included for three sets of standings.

References

External links
Official website

|- style="text-align:center"
|width="35%"|Previous race:
|width="30%"|Deutsche Tourenwagen Masters2022 season
|width="40%"|Next race:

Portimão DTM
Portimão DTM
Portimão DTM